Staffordshire Moorlands District Council elections are held every four years. Staffordshire Moorlands District Council is the local authority for the non-metropolitan district of Staffordshire Moorlands in Staffordshire, England. Since the last boundary changes in 2003, 56 councillors have been elected from 27 wards.

Political control
The first elections were held in 1973, initially operating as a shadow authority until the new arrangements came into effect on 1 April 1974. Political control of the council since 1974 has been held by the following parties:

Leadership
The leaders of the council since 1999 have been:

Council elections
1973 Staffordshire Moorlands District Council election
1976 Staffordshire Moorlands District Council election (New ward boundaries)
1979 Staffordshire Moorlands District Council election
1983 Staffordshire Moorlands District Council election
1987 Staffordshire Moorlands District Council election
1991 Staffordshire Moorlands District Council election (District boundary changes took place but the number of seats remained the same)
1995 Staffordshire Moorlands District Council election (District boundary changes took place but the number of seats remained the same)
1999 Staffordshire Moorlands District Council election
2003 Staffordshire Moorlands District Council election (New ward boundaries)
2007 Staffordshire Moorlands District Council election
2011 Staffordshire Moorlands District Council election
2015 Staffordshire Moorlands District Council election
2019 Staffordshire Moorlands District Council election

Changes between elections

By-elections

Resignations
Conservative councillor Rebecca K Done (Leek East) resigned in 2017 forcing the by-election subsequently won by the Labour candidate Darren Price.

References

External links
Staffordshire Moorlands District Council

 
Council elections in Staffordshire
Staffordshire Moorlands
District council elections in England